Devils Elbow is the third album from The Mess Hall and was released on 27 October 2007. It peaked at No. 2 on the ARIA Hitseekers Albums Chart. It provided a single, "Keep Walking", earlier in the same month. The album won the Australian Music Prize in 2007, an annual award for album of the year, as well as $25,000 prize money.

Reception

Track listing

 "Keep Walking" – 3:39
 "Pulse" – 4:33
 "City of Roses" – 3:50
 "Load Left" – 4:16
 "Lorelei" – 3:18
 "Cookie" – 5:15
 "Part 1" – 4:31
 "Betty" – 4:19
 "Buddy" – 4:11
 "Be Not A Man" 4:04

Personnel 

Jed Kurzel – vocals, guitar
Cec Condon – drums, vocals

References 

2007 albums
Ivy League Records albums
The Mess Hall albums